Liberty Middle School is the name of several United States middle schools:

Liberty Middle School (Florida), in Tampa
Liberty Middle School (Ocala, Florida)
Liberty Middle School (Orlando, Florida); see 
Liberty Middle School (Georgia)
Liberty High School (Liberty, Missouri)
Liberty Middle School (Nebraska), a school in the Papillion-La Vista school district
Liberty Middle School (New Jersey)
Liberty Middle School (Virginia)
Washington-Liberty High School (Arlington, Virginia)
Liberty Middle School, Camas Washington

See also
 Liberty North High School (Liberty, Missouri)
 Liberty High School (disambiguation)
 Liberty School (disambiguation)